Bertina Lopes (July 11, 1924 – February 10, 2012) was a Mozambican-born, Italian painter and sculptor. Lopes' work displays a deep African sensibility with saturated colours and bold compositions of mask-like figures and geometric forms. She has been acknowledged for highlighting 'the social criticism and nationalistic fervour that influenced other Mozambican artists of her time'.

Personal life 
Lopes was born in Maputo (formerly known as Lourenço Marques), Mozambique, on July 11, 1924, to an African mother, whose family was locally known, and a Portuguese father, who was a fieldworker. She was educated in Maputo, but after her second year of senior high school, she relocated to Lisbon to complete secondary school, where she studied painting and drawing with Lino António and Celestino Alves and earned a degree in painting and sculpture. Around that time she met artists such as Marcelino Vespeira, Carlos Botelho, Albertina Mantua, Costa Pinheiro, Júlio Pomar and Nuno Sampayo. In 1953 Lopes returned to Mozambique, where she married poet Virgilio de Lemos, with whom she had twin sons. Lopes taught Artistic Drawing at General Machado Girls’ Technical School for nine years. Although she was appreciated for her innovative teaching skills, these would occasionally enter in conflict with the school ruling system. In 1955 de Lemos published an anti-colonial poem that resulted in a trial for desecration of the Portuguese flag. He subsequently joined the Mozambican Resistance (1954–61) and was arrested for subversion. The events reinforced Lopes' sympathy for the weak and oppressed fringes of the population  – a subject that would often recur in her art. During this period of her life, cultural nationalism became a large influence for both her artwork and personal ideology.

In 1956, Lopes painted a mural called "Pavilhão da Evocação Històrica" which was inaugurated on the occasion of an official visit of António de Oliveira Salazar to Maputo. Three years later, she was nominated president of the “Nùcleo de Arte” of Maputo and Vice President of “Direcção” of “Nùcleo de Arte”. Due to her association with de Lemos, and with the outbreak of the Mozambican War of Independence in sight, Lopes was forced to leave Mozambique in 1961. After a short period of time in Lisbon, she moved to Rome. In 1964 she married Francesco Confaloni, a computer engineer and art lover. During those times she befriended some of the protagonists of the Italian art scene, including Marino Marini, Renato Guttuso, Carlo Levi and Antonio Scordia. In 1965, Lopes obtained Italian citizenship. In 1979, Lopes paid a visit to Mozambique for the first time since her departure, and in 1982, her work was the subject of a large exhibition at the Museu Nacional de Arte Moderna in Maputo.

In 1986 her first retrospective opened at Palazzo Venezia in Rome. In 1993 she was honoured as Commander for Merits by the President of the Republic of Portugal Mario Soares in Lisbon. In 1995 Lopes was the winner of the Gabriele D'Annunzio Prize in Rome. In 2002 she was honoured by Italian President Carlo Azeglio Ciampi for her contributions to the art. Lopes' last public appearance was at the Venice Biennale in 2011.

She died in Rome in 2012 at the age of 86. Mozambican President Armando Guebuza described Lopes as 'a humble, creative, combative and generous woman, who always demanded of herself that she surpass her previous achievements'.

Work 
Lopes' work was influenced by multiple sources, including Mozambican art and Portuguese modernism. Between 1946 and 1956, she embraced the art of Western painters and South American graffiti artists. Following Picasso's death in 1973, Lopes paid tribute to him with an intense painting that symbolized political repression in Spain. Once Lopes grew closer to antifascist circles, she started opposing the idea of "arte negra (black art) and found inspiration in the poetry of José Craveirinha and Noémia de Sousa, incorporating social themes into her work.

Lopes’ work was also deeply influenced by the political events that affected her home country, in particular during the period that followed the independence and the civil war between FRELIMO and RENAMO. Much of Lopes' work featured African fairy tales and stories that relate to the political events occurring at the time of production.

Awards 

1950 – Painting Prize, Lourenço Marques (Mozambique)

1953 – Medalha de Prata, Lourenço Marques (Mozambique)

1953 – Prémio Empresa Moderna, Lda., Lourenço Marques (Mozambique)

1958 – First Classified (Maior Mérito Artistico), Beira (Mozambique)

1974 – Trullo D’Oro, Fasano di Puglia, Brindisi

1974 – La Mamma nell’arte, Comunità di Sant’Egidio, Rome

1975 – International Painting Prize, International Center of Mediterranean Art and Culture, Corfu (Greece)

1978 – Leader d’arte. Campidoglio, Rome

1986 – Venere d’Argento, Erice, Trapani

1988 – Grand Prix d’Honnoeur, European Union of Art Critics, Rome

1991 – Rachel Carson Memorial Foundation World Prize, Rome

1992 – La Plejade per l’Arte, Rome

1993 – Commander for Merits, appointed by Mario Soares, President of the Republic of Portugal, Lisbon

1994 – Centro Francescano Internazionale di Studi per il dialogo fra i popoli (Franciscan International Study Center to promote dialogue among people), Assisi

1995 – Gabriele D’Annunzio Prize, Pescara

1996 – Messaggero della Pace UNIPAX Prize, Rome

1998 – Premio Internazionale Arte e Solidarietà nell’Arca, Florence

1998 – Frà Angelico International Prize, Rome

2002 – Silver Plaque by the President of the Republic of Italy, Rome

Bibliography 
Nello Ponente, Bertina Lopes, Skema Centro d'Arte e Cultura, Rome, 1978
Enrico Crispolti, Lungo viaggio di Bertina Lopes, Palazzo Venezia, Rome, 1986
Pino Nazio, Bertina Lopes: Il cerchio della vita, Museo Campano, Capua, 2007
Claudio Crescentini, Bertina Lopes: Tutto (o quasi), Palombi Editori, Rome, 2013
Claudio Crescentini, Bertina Lopes: Arte e Antagonismo, Erreciemme Edizioni, Rome, 2017

References 

1924 births
2012 deaths
20th-century Mozambican painters
21st-century Mozambican painters
20th-century women artists
21st-century women artists
Mozambican people of Portuguese descent
Mozambican emigrants to Italy
People from Maputo
Mozambican women artists
Mozambican women painters
Italian women artists
Italian contemporary artists
Mozambican sculptors
Mozambican women sculptors
20th-century sculptors
21st-century sculptors
Mozambican expatriates in Portugal